The Vrak – Museum of Wrecks is a Swedish museum of maritime archeology in Stockholm in Sweden. It is managed by the Maritime Museum in Stockholm and was opened in September 2021 in Boat hangar No 2 at Galärvarvet (Galley Shipyard) at Djurgården.

Operations

The project is planned by the Maritime Museum in cooperation with the Marine Archeology Institute of the Södertörn University, Maris.

The Museum of Wrecks shows the Baltic sea cultural heritage, especially some of the almost one hundred identified old shipwrecks at the bottom of the sea.

References 
About marine archeology at the website of Sjöhistoriska museet (Swedish), läst den 10 August 2019

External links
 Official website
Video on the Baltic Sea cultural heritage

Maritime archaeology
Museums in Stockholm
Maritime museums in Sweden